金 is a Chinese character meaning gold or metal, it may refer to:

 Kangxi radical 167
Jin dynasty (1115–1234)
Kim (Korean surname)
Catty
Jin (Chinese surname)